NA-237 Karachi East-II is a newly-created a constituency for the National Assembly of Pakistan. It mainly comprises the Gulshan-e-Iqbal Subdivision, and census charge 12 and 13 of Jamshed Quarters. It was created in the 2018 delimitation from areas of old NA-252 and the section of Gulshan-e-Iqbal in NA-253.

Area
This constituency consists of Mohammad Ali Society, Dhoraji, Pir Ilahi Buksh Colony, PECHS-II, Bahadurabad, Eissa Nagri, Gulshan-e-Iqbal, Patel Para, Gulistan-e-Jauhar, Sharafabad and East Garden areas of Karachi East District.

Members of Parliament

Since 2018: NA-243 Karachi East-II

Election 2018 

General elections were held on 25 July 2018. Chairman Pakistan Tehreek-e-Insaf, Imran Khan won the election but vacated this constituency and three others in favor of NA-95 (Mianwali-I).

By-election 2018

By-elections were held in this constituency on 14 October 2018.

By-election 2023 
A by-election will be held on 16 March 2023 due to the resignation of Alamgir Khan, the previous MNA from this seat.

See also
NA-236 Karachi East-I
NA-238 Karachi East-III

References 

Karachi